Kabhie To Nazar Milao is an Indian television drama series that premiered on Sony Entertainment Television on 15 May 2006. The series was produced by the UTV Software Communications, in association with in-house production of Sony Pictures.

Plot 
Karun doesn't realize that the girl with whom he falls in love because of her eyes is unable to see. As story moves on, Karun finds out that Sunaina cannot see; therefore, he decides that he will be her eyesight. Now Sunaina confronts all adversities of life with the help of Karun, but she doesn't realize that being too dependent on someone can be sorrowful.

Cast
Sudeepa Singh as Sunaina
Gagan Arya as Karun
Nishigandha Wad
Mahru Shaikh
Sharad Malhotra
Kishori Shahane
Lalit Parimoo

References

External links
Official Site on SET Asia
Kabhie To Nazar Milao News Article on tellychakkar.com

Indian television soap operas
Sony Entertainment Television original programming
2006 Indian television series debuts
UTV Television